Chlidichthys randalli is a species of fish in the family Pseudochromidae.

Description

Distribution and habitat
Chlidichthys randalli is found near Mauritius in the Indian Ocean.

Etmyology
The fish is named in honor of John E. Randall (1924-2020) of the Bishop Museum  in Honolulu, who provided the specimens for this species.

References

Randall, J.E. and C. Anderson, 1993. Annotated checklist of the epipelagic and shore fishes of the Maldives Islands. Ichthyol. Bull. of the J.L.B. Smith Inst. of Ichthyol. (59):1-47.

Pseudoplesiopinae
Taxa named by Roger Lubbock
Fish described in 1977